In superconductivity, the Lockin effect refers to the preference of vortex phases to be positioned at certain points within cells of a crystal lattice of an organic superconductor.

References

Studies of the Vortex Phases in an Organic Superconductor

 

Superconductivity